Santos Rodrigo Navarro Arteaga (born November 20, 1990 in Santa Cruz de la Sierra) is a Bolivian football midfielder who most recently played for Sport Boys.

Club career
Navarro developed his football career at the Tahuichi Academy. During the 2010 winter transfer window he was signed by professional club Blooming. He made his debut with the celestes on August 1 against San José in Oruro.

References

External links
 
 

1990 births
Living people
Sportspeople from Santa Cruz de la Sierra
Association football midfielders
Bolivian footballers
Club Blooming players